James Gregory may refer to:

 James Gregory (mathematician) (1638–1675), Scottish mathematician and astronomer
 James Gregory (physician) (1753–1821), Scottish physician
 James Gregory (mineralogist) (1832–1899), Scottish mineralogist
 James Gregory (actor) (1911–2002), American actor
 James Gregory (prison officer) (1941–2003), South African prison guard, author of Goodbye Bafana
 James Gregory (comedian) (born 1946), American comedian
 Jim Gregory (basketball), American former college basketball standout
 Jim Gregory (football chairman) (1928–1998), former English football club director and chairman
 Jim Gregory (footballer) (1876–1949), Australian rules footballer
 Jim Gregory (ice hockey) (1935–2019), Canadian general manager and league executive in the National Hockey League
 Jim Gregory (politician) (elected 2018), American politician from Pennsylvania
 James Crawford Gregory (1801–1832), Scottish physician 
 James G. Gregory (1843–1932), Surgeon General of Connecticut and member of the Connecticut House of Representatives
 James Monroe Gregory (1849–1915), professor of Latin and dean at Howard University